Rhem-Waldrop House, also known as the John L. Rhem House, is a historic home located at New Bern, Craven County, North Carolina.  It was built about 1855, and is a -story, five bay by four bay, stuccoed brick dwelling in the Renaissance Revival style.  It has a high deck-on-hip roof with dormers and a semicircular entrance porch with fluted columns.

It was listed on the National Register of Historic Places in 1972.

References

Houses on the National Register of Historic Places in North Carolina
Renaissance Revival architecture in North Carolina
Houses completed in 1855
Houses in New Bern, North Carolina
National Register of Historic Places in Craven County, North Carolina